John Michael Horvath (born János Horváth; 30 July 1924 in Budapest – 12 March 2015) was a Hungarian-American mathematician noted for his contributions to analysis especially in functional analysis and distribution theory.

Education and career
Horvath received his doctorate in 1947 from the University of Budapest as a student of Lipót Fejér and Frigyes Riesz. Four other talented mathematicians also graduated in the class of 1947: János Aczél, Ákos Császár, László Fuchs and István Gál. Together with Horvath, they were referred to as the Big Five. After obtaining his doctorate, he went to the French National Centre for Scientific Research (CNRS) to do research, then to the University of Los Andes in Bogota, and finally, from 1957 to 1994 he taught in the United States at the University of Maryland and was then awarded the title of Professor Emeritus.

MathSciNet called his book Topological Vector Spaces and Distributions, "The most readable introduction to the theory of vector spaces available in English and possibly any other language."

His work on analytic continuations and a general definition of the Convolution of distributions was essential to Laurent Schwartz who went on to develop a full theory of distributions in the late 1940s.

In 2006 he edited and wrote one of the chapters for A Panorama of Hungarian Mathematics in the Twentieth Century.

He was a member of the Hungarian Academy of Sciences.

Works
 (2005) A Panorama of Hungarian Mathematics in the Twentieth Century Springer-Verlag Berlin Heidelberg. 
 (1966) Topological Vector Spaces and Distributions Addison-Wesley, Reading, Massachusetts.

References

External links

1924 births
2015 deaths
20th-century Hungarian mathematicians
Mathematical analysts
Budapest University alumni
Members of the Hungarian Academy of Sciences
University System of Maryland faculty
University of Los Andes (Colombia) alumni
Expatriate academics in the United States
Hungarian expatriates in the United States